Eshbach is an unincorporated community in Washington Township in Berks County, Pennsylvania, United States. Eshbach is located at the intersection of Old Route 100 and Stauffer Road.

References

Unincorporated communities in Berks County, Pennsylvania
Unincorporated communities in Pennsylvania